Statistics of the  Cambodian League for the 1990 season.

Overview
Ministry of Transports won the championship.

References
RSSSF

C-League seasons
Cambodia
Cambodia
football